Hilding Axel Erik Heinrichs (5 June 1932 – 26 April 2021) was a Finnish diplomat, a master of political science by education. He has been the Consul General of Finland in New York City from 1980 to 1985, the Ambassador to Jakarta from 1985 to 1989, as the Negotiating Officer of the Ministry for Foreign Affairs from 1989 to 1991 and the Ambassador to Ottawa from 1991 to 1995

References 

1932 births
2021 deaths
Diplomats from Helsinki
Ambassadors of Finland to Indonesia
Ambassadors of Finland to Canada